KLIX (1310 kHz) is an AM radio station broadcasting a News Talk Information format serving the Twin Falls, Idaho, United States, area. The station is currently owned by Townsquare Media and licensed to Townsquare License, LLC. KLIX features programming from Fox News Radio, Premiere Networks, and Westwood One.

The station's skywave signal has been received in Salt Lake City, Utah, Bonners Ferry, Idaho and Green River, Wyoming.

Ownership
In October 2007, a deal was reached for KLIX to be acquired by GAP Broadcasting II LLC (Samuel Weller, president) from Clear Channel Communications as part of a 57 station deal, with a total reported sale price of $74.78 million. What eventually became GapWest Broadcasting was folded into Townsquare Media on August 13, 2010.

References

External links

Newsradio 1310 Facebook

LIX
News and talk radio stations in the United States
Townsquare Media radio stations
Radio stations established in 1947